The 1908–09 City Cup was the fifteenth edition of the City Cup, a cup competition in Irish football.

The tournament was won by Shelbourne for the first time.

Group standings

References

1908–09 in Irish association football